Binod Prasad Dhital (1923–2007) was a poet and novelist from Nepal. He is best known for his mythological novel Yojana Gandha, for which he was awarded the Madan Puraskar and Sajha Puraskar in 1995.

Biography

Dhital was born in Tripureshwor, Kathmandu, Nepal, to Bhairab Prasad Dhital and Hutasan Kumari on 10 June 1923, and died on 16 August  2007. He served as a government employee as a Law Secretary at the Ministry of Law and devoted full-time to his passion for Nepali literature after retirement.

Works

Dhital wrote poetry and novels. His works include Ujyalo Hunu Aghi, Acharya Bisnugupt Chanakya (Nepali translation), Astauna Lageka Chandramasanga, and a Nepali translation of Dante’s Divine Comedy.

His novel Yojana Gandha, based on the Sanskrit epic Mahabharata, was published by Sajha Prakashan in 1995. He received the Madan Puraskar, Nepal's most prestigious literary award, for this novel as well as the Sajha Puraskar, a literary award given by Sajha Publications.

References 

Nepalese writers
Madan Puraskar winners
1923 births
2007 deaths
Sajha Puraskar winners